Lonnie Ray Frisbee (June 6, 1949 – March 12, 1993) was an American Charismatic evangelist and self-described "seeing prophet" in the late 1960s and 1970s. He maintained a hippie appearance. He was notable as a minister and evangelist in the Jesus movement.

Eyewitness accounts of his ministry, documented in the 2007 documentary, Frisbee: The Life and Death of a Hippie Preacher, explain how Frisbee became the charismatic spark igniting the rise of Chuck Smith's Calvary Chapel and the Vineyard Movement, two worldwide denominations and among the largest evangelical denominations to emerge from the period. It was said that "he was not one of the hippie preachers, but rather that "there was one—Frisbee". The term 'power evangelism' comes from Frisbee's ministry. Later, he would be harshly criticized for his intense focus and heavy concentration on the Holy Spirit and the gifts of the Spirit, often by individuals in the same churches he co-founded.

Frisbee also influenced many prophetic evangelists including Jonathan Land, Marc Dupont, Jill Austin and others. Frisbee co-founded the House of Miracles commune and was its main architect, converting many. The House of Miracles grew into a series of nineteen communal houses that later migrated to Oregon to form Shiloh Youth Revival Centers, the largest and one of the longest-lasting of the Jesus People communal groups.

Frisbee functioned as an evangelical preacher while also privately socializing as a gay man, before and during his evangelism career, although he stated in interviews that he never believed homosexuality was anything other than a sin in the eyes of God. Both of the denominations he helped to found prohibited homosexual behavior, and he was later excommunicated by the denominations because of his active sexual life, first removing him from leadership positions, and then ultimately firing him. He was shunned and "written out of the official histories." As part of his ostracism from his former churches, his work was diminished, ignored, and maligned. But since then, his positive impact has been remembered and he has become a complex figure within the discussion of Christianity and homosexuality. The 2023 film Jesus Revolution highlighted his ministry with Chuck Smith and the impact he had on Greg Laurie's evangelism.

Early life and career
Frisbee was raised in a single-parent home and was exposed to "sketchy, dangerous characters" as a child. Frisbee's brother claimed Lonnie was raped at the age of eight and documentarian David di Sabatino postulated that an incident of that nature "fragments your identity." His father ran off with another woman and his mother tracked down and married the jilted husband.

Frisbee showed great interest in the arts and cooking. He won awards for his paintings and even appeared as a featured dancer on Casey Kasem's mid-60s TV show Shebang. He exhibited a "bohemian" streak and regularly ran away from home. As a teen he became involved in the drug culture as part of his spiritual quest, and at fifteen he entered Laguna Beach's gay underground scene with a friend. His spotty high school education left him barely able to read and write. At 18 he joined thousands of other flower children and hippies for the Summer of Love in San Francisco in 1967. He described himself as a "nudist-vegetarian-hippie".

Frisbee's unofficial evangelism career began as a part of a soul-searching LSD acid-trip as part of a regular "turn on, tune in, drop out" session of getting high. He would often read the Bible while tripping. On one pilgrimage with friends to Tahquitz Canyon outside Palm Springs, instead of looking for meaning again in mysticism and the occult, Frisbee started reading the Gospel of John to the group, eventually leading the group to Tahquitz Falls and baptizing them. A later acid-trip in the same area produced "a vision of a vast sea of people crying out to the Lord for salvation, with Frisbee in front preaching the gospel." His "grand vision of spreading Christianity to the masses" alienated his family and friends. Frisbee left for San Francisco where he had won a fellowship to the San Francisco Art Academy. He soon met members of Haight-Ashbury's Living Room mission. At the time, he talked about UFOs, practiced hypnotism, and talked about dabbling in occultism and mysticism. When Christian missionaries first met him, they said he was talking about "Jesus and flying saucers". Frisbee converted to Christianity, and joined the first street Christian community, The Living Room, a storefront coffeehouse commune of four couples in the Haight-Ashbury district of San Francisco started in 1967. He quit the art academy and moved to Novato, California, to set up a commune and later reconnected with his former girlfriend Connie Bremer, whom he then married. The community was soon dubbed The House of Acts after the community of early Christians in the Acts of the Apostles. Frisbee designed a sign to put outside the house, but was informed that if he gave it an official name, it would no longer be considered a mere guest house and would be subject to renovations. The community took the sign down to avoid the financial obligation. Frisbee continued painting detailed oils including several of missions.

Jesus movement, Calvary Chapel
Chuck Smith had been making plans to build a chapel out of a surplus school building in the city of Santa Ana, near Costa Mesa, when he met Frisbee. Smith's daughter's boyfriend John was a former addict who had turned to Christianity. When Smith said he wanted to meet a hippie, John brought home Frisbee (who was hitch-hiking), so he could meet people to talk about Jesus and salvation. Frisbee and his wife Connie joined the fledgling Calvary Chapel congregation and Smith was struck by Frisbee's charisma. Smith said, "I was not at all prepared for the love that this young man would radiate." Frisbee became one of the most important ministers in the church when on May 17, 1968, Smith put the young couple in charge of the Costa Mesa rehab house called "The House of Miracles" with John Higgins and his wife Jackie. Within a week it had 35 new converts. Bunk beds were built in the garage to house all the new converts. Frisbee led the Wednesday night Bible study, which soon became the central night for the church attracting thousands. Frisbee's attachment to the charismatic Pentecostal style caused some disagreement within the church, since he seemed focused more on gaining converts and experiencing the presence of the Holy Spirit than on teaching newer converts Biblical doctrine. Chuck Smith took up that job and welcomed Frisbee into his church. Frisbee's appearance helped appeal to hippies and those interested in youth culture, and Frisbee believed that the youth culture would play a prominent role in the Christian movement in the United States. He cited Joel the prophet and remained upbeat despite what the young couple saw as unbalanced treatment, as Frisbee was never paid for his work, yet another person was hired full-time as Smith's assistant.

The country was being swept with a youth movement with California as one of the epicenters. The counterculture of hippies and surfers hung around the beaches; music and the resulting dancing was the main form of communication. Frisbee would walk the beaches during the day and convert the young people and bring them back to the church for the nightly services.

The House of Miracles grew into a series of nineteen communal houses that later migrated to Oregon to form Shiloh Youth Revival Centers, the largest and one of the longest lasting of the Jesus People communal groups which had 100,000 members and 175 communal houses spread across North America. This may have been the largest Christian communal group in US history.

From 1968 to 1971, Frisbee was a leader in the Jesus movement, bringing in thousands of new converts and influencing Calvary Chapel leaders including Mike MacIntosh and Greg Laurie, whom he mentored.

Fame
"Jesus Freaks", or "Jesus People" as they were often called, were documented in media including the Kathryn Kuhlman I Believe In Miracles show where Frisbee was a featured guest talking about Jesus, prophets and quoting scripture. By 1971, the Jesus Movement had broken in the media with major media outlets such as Life, Newsweek and Rolling Stone covering it. Frisbee, due to his prominence in the movement, was frequently photographed and interviewed. It was also in 1971 that Frisbee and Smith parted ways because their theological differences had become too great. Smith discounted Pentecostalism, maintaining that love was the greatest manifestation of the Holy Spirit, while Frisbee was strongly involved in theology centering on spiritual gifts and New Testament occurrences. Frisbee announced that he would leave California altogether and go to a movement in Florida led by Derek Prince and Bob Mumford which taught a pyramid shepherding style of leadership and was later coined as the Shepherding Movement.

In 1973, the Frisbees divorced because Frisbee's pastor had an affair with his wife. Frisbee mentions this in a sermon he gave at the Vineyard Church in Denver, Colorado, a few years before he died. Connie later remarried. Lonnie left the organization.

Vineyard movement
Meanwhile, in May 1977, John Wimber was laying the groundwork for what would become the Association of Vineyard Churches, also known as the Vineyard Movement. He had witnessed the explosive growth of Calvary Chapel and sought to build a church that embraced the healings and miracles that he had previously been taught were no longer a part of Christian life. He began teaching and preaching about spiritual gifts and healings, but Wimber held that it wasn't until May 1979, when Frisbee gave his testimony during an evening service at what was then the Yorba Linda branch of the Calvary Chapel movement (later, the Anaheim Vineyard Christian Fellowship) that the charismatic gifts of the Holy Spirit took hold of the church.

Since his early days at Calvary Chapel Costa Mesa, Frisbee had made a shift in his emphasis from evangelism to the dramatic and demonstrative manifestation of the power of the Holy Spirit. After speaking Frisbee invited all the young people 25 and under to come forward and invited the Holy Spirit to bring God's power into their lives. Witnesses say it looked like a battlefield as young people fell and began to shake and speak in tongues. The young kids, many in Junior High and High School, were so "filled with the Spirit" that they soon started baptizing friends in hot tubs and swimming pools around town. The church catapulted in growth over the next few months and the event is credited with launching the Vineyard Movement. After this time, Frisbee and Wimber began traveling the world, visiting South Africa and Europe. Frisbee was a much sought-after preacher with his "Jesus-like" look getting him instant recognition from South Africa to Denmark. While there, they performed many healings and miracles for people. As reported by many who were there, Frisbee was integral to the development of what would later become Wimber's "Signs and Wonders theology".

Sexuality revealed
Although Frisbee's homosexuality was documented as a "bit of an open secret in the church community" and that he would "party" on Saturday night then preach Sunday morning, many in the church were unaware of his "other life." Eventually some church officials felt that Frisbee's inability to overcome what the church considered to be sexual immorality became a hindrance to his ministry. An article in The Orange County Weekly, headlined "The First Jesus Freak," chronicles Frisbee's life, in which Matt Coker writes, "Chuck Smith Jr. says he was having lunch with Wimber one day when he asked how the pastor reconciled working with a known homosexual like Frisbee. Wimber asked how the younger Smith knew this. Smith said he'd received a call from a pastor who'd just heard a young man confess to having been in a six-month relationship with Frisbee. Wimber called Smith the next day to say he'd confronted Frisbee, who openly admitted to the affair and agreed to leave."

By his own account, Frisbee was raped by a man who had attended one of Lonnie’s revival meetings six years prior.  Lonnie states, "Over the next few weeks, this man began to spread it around that he had a sexual relationship with Lonnie Frisbee.  He told people, including church leaders, that he had sex with me.  Not true.  I was violently forced a knifepoint totally against my will.  His lies caused me years of not being able to minister, as this accusation spread throughout the Christian community."  He next describes some of the fallout. “I gave in to drugs and sexual temptation.  I had become deceived and overpowered.  I had been constantly accused of things, mostly of which I didn’t do --- so why not live up to my reputation?  That was more or less my subconscious justification for crossing the lines.  I blamed everyone else, including the church."

However, Frisbee never characterized himself as a homosexual: “. . . in the last segment of my life story.  I said it was a counterfeit.  But I would like to go into the subject a little more at this time.  . . . I stated ‘I never lived the gay lifestyle,' I would like to add that I have never even considered myself a homosexual at all, even though I had been molested for years as a child, had sexually experimented as a part of the rebellious ‘free love generation’ . . . and there is also my disappointing backsliding days in the mid-eighties."

In 2005, film critic Peter Chattaway interviewed David Di Sabatino (director of the documentary Frisbee: The Life and Death of a Hippie Preacher) for Christianity Today; the two spoke about addressing Frisbee's homosexuality with his family. Said Di Sabatino, "I brought to light some things that not a lot of people knew. I've been in rooms with his family where I've had to tell them that he defined himself as gay, way back. Nobody knew that. There's a lot of hubris in that, to come to people who loved him and prayed for him, and to stand there and say, 'You didn't really know this, but...'" In the same interview Di Sabatino also stated, "His early testimony at Calvary Chapel was that he had come out of the homosexual lifestyle, but he felt like a leper because a lot of people turned away from him after that, so he took it out of his testimony—and I think that's an indictment of the church." Di Sabatino commented on Frisbee's homosexuality as a flaw and stated that Frisbee's brother claimed Frisbee was raped at the age of eight and postulated that an incident of that nature "fragments your identity, and now I can't say that I'm surprised at all." In other research Di Sabatino revealed that Frisbee had come from a broken home and entered into Laguna Beach's gay underground scene with a friend when he was 15.

Death
At the time it was cited a brain tumor as his cause of death. Another source claimed Frisbee contracted AIDS and died from complications associated with the condition in 1993; At his funeral at the Crystal Cathedral, Calvary Chapel's Chuck Smith eulogized Frisbee as a spiritual son and said he was a Samson-like figure; that being a man through whom God did many great works, but was the victim of his own struggles and temptations. Some saw this as further maligning Frisbee's work and an inappropriate characterization at a funeral service. Others, such as Frisbee's friend John Ruttkay, saw the Samson analogy as spot on, and said so at his funeral. Frisbee was interred in the Crystal Cathedral Memorial Gardens.

Frisbee: The Life and Death of a Hippie Preacher
David Di Sabatino produced and directed the video documentary: Frisbee: The Life and Death of a Hippie Preacher. Narrated by Jim Palosaari, it received an Emmy Award nomination from the National Academy of Television Arts and Sciences (San Francisco/NorCal chapter).

Finished in March 2005, Frisbee was first accepted to the Newport Beach Film Festival where it sold out the Lido Theater not far from where in the late 1960s the Frisbees ran the Blue Top commune, a Christian community of young hippie believers. The documentary was also accepted to the Mill Valley (2005), Reel Heart (2005), Ragamuffin (2005), San Francisco International Independent (2006), New York Underground (2006) and Philadelphia Gay & Lesbian (2006) film festivals. The edited movie showed on San Francisco's KQED in November 2006, and was released in DVD form in January 2007.

A soundtrack featuring the music of The All Saved Freak Band, Agape, Joy and Gentle Faith was released in May 2007. A pre-release version of the DVD was produced that featured 21 recordings of songs by Larry Norman alone, as well as others by Randy Stonehill, Love Song, Fred Caban, Mark Heard, and Stonewood Cross. However, due to licensing issues most of the music was changed for the final release.

See also

 Jesus music
 Duane Pederson
 Troy D. Perry
 Mel White

References

External links
 
 Frisbee: The Life and Death of a Hippie Preacher, official site
 
 Lonnie Frisbee's testimony (preaching) on Mother's Day at Pastor John Wimber's Church, May 11, 1988, part 2; audio only with extensive photo slideshow. It is believed by some that this very meeting inspired the Vineyard Church movement (trailer on video gives date of 5-11-88, however vineyardusa.org states that this occurred in 1980).
 Lonnie Frisbee ministering at Tom Stipe’s Vineyard Christian Fellowship in Denver, Colorado
 Lonnie Frisbee related videos on YouTube
 photo of Frisbee
 Understanding Ministries -- Lonnie Frisbee : The Problem of Charismatic Hypocrisy by Paul Fahy, a theological criticism of charismatic religion allowing 'emotion' to triumph over doctrine, using Lonnie Frisbee as case study and example.
  Interview with Connie Frisbee discussing Lonnie in response to Frisbee:The Life and Death of a Hippie Preacher

1949 births
1993 deaths
20th-century Protestants
20th-century Christian mystics
AIDS-related deaths in California
American evangelicals
American Charismatics
American Christian mystics
American Protestant ministers and clergy
Jesus movement
LGBT people from California
LGBT Protestant clergy
People from Costa Mesa, California
People from Novato, California
Prophets in Christianity
Protestant mystics